R.O.C.K. is a 1986 hard rock/heavy metal album by Kirka. A major departure from Kirka's typical easy listening albums, the album featured English language lyrics, written by Kassu Halonen, and was largely hard rock oriented. Although Kirka had done covers by rock artists in the past, R.O.C.K. was his first full-fledged rock-album.

It was followed the next year by The Spell after which Kirka resumed with his better known ballad material.

Track listing
 R.O.C.K. Rock
 Strangers in the Night
 In My Dreams
 School's Out (Alice Cooper cover)
 You get me up
 Born to be Wild (Steppenwolf cover)
 Bad brakes
 You
 Set me free
 I'll be yours.

Kassu Halonen, one of the songwriters on the album, later covered Strangers in the Night on I Have Played Rock n Roll.

External sources
 Kirka's biography and discography on Pomus
 Album on Kirka.com

1986 albums